, also known mononymously as , is a Japanese former professional baseball outfielder who played professionally for 28 seasons. He played nine years of his career with the Orix BlueWave of Nippon Professional Baseball (NPB), where he began his career, and 14 with the Seattle Mariners of Major League Baseball (MLB). After playing the first 12 years of his MLB career for the Mariners, Suzuki played two and a half seasons with the New York Yankees and three with the Miami Marlins. He returned to the Mariners for his final two seasons.

In his combined playing time in the NPB and MLB, Suzuki received 17 consecutive selections both as an All-Star and Gold Glove winner, won nine league batting titles, and was named most valuable player (MVP) four times. In the NPB, he won seven consecutive batting titles and three consecutive Pacific League MVP Awards. In 2001, Suzuki became the first Japanese-born position player to be posted and signed to an MLB club. He led the American League (AL) in batting average and stolen bases en route to being named AL Rookie of the Year and AL MVP.

Suzuki was the first MLB player to enter the Japanese Baseball Hall of Fame (The Golden Players Club). He was a ten-time MLB All-Star and won the 2007 All-Star Game MVP Award for a three-hit performance that included the event's first-ever inside-the-park home run. Suzuki won a Rawlings Gold Glove Award in each of his first 10 years in the majors and had an American League–record seven hitting streaks of 20 or more games, with a high of 27. He was also noted for the longevity of his career, continuing to produce at a high level with slugging, and on-base percentages above .300 in 2016, while approaching 43 years of age. Suzuki also set a number of batting records, including MLB's single-season record for hits with 262. He achieved 10 consecutive 200-hit seasons, the longest streak by any player in history. In 2016, Suzuki notched the 3,000th hit of his MLB career, becoming only the 30th player ever to do so. In total, he finished with 4,367 hits in his professional career across Japan and the United States, the most of any player in history at the top level of baseball.

Early life
Ichiro grew up in Toyoyama, a small town just outside Nagoya. At the age of seven, Ichiro joined his first baseball team and asked his father, Nobuyuki Suzuki (鈴木宣之), to teach him to be a better player. The two began a daily routine, which included throwing 50 pitches, fielding 50 infield balls and 50 outfield balls, and hitting 500 pitches, 250 from a pitching machine and 250 from his father.

As a little leaguer in Toyoyama, Ichiro had the word  written on his glove. By age 12, he had dedicated himself to pursuing a career in professional baseball, and their training sessions were no longer for leisure, and less enjoyable. The elder Suzuki claimed, "Baseball was fun for both of us," but Ichiro later said, "It might have been fun for him, but for me it was a lot like Star of the Giants," a popular Japanese manga and anime series about a young baseball prospect's difficult road to success, with rigorous training demanded by the father. According to Ichiro, "It bordered on hazing and I suffered a lot."

When Ichiro joined his high-school baseball team, his father told the coach, "No matter how good Ichiro is, don't ever praise him. We have to make him spiritually strong." When he was ready to enter high school, Ichiro was selected by a school with a prestigious baseball program, Nagoya's Aikodai Meiden (:ja:愛工大名電) High School. Ichiro was primarily used as a pitcher instead of as an outfielder, owing to his exceptionally strong arm. His cumulative high-school batting average was .505, with 19 home runs. He built strength and stamina by hurling car tires and hitting Wiffle balls with a heavy shovel, among other regimens. These exercises helped develop his wrists and hips, adding power and endurance to his thin frame. Years later, Ichiro told an interviewer, "I'm not a big guy, and hopefully kids could look at me and see that I'm not muscular and not physically imposing, that I'm just a regular guy. So if somebody with a regular body can get into the record books, kids can look at that. That would make me happy."

Career in Japan
Ichiro made his NPB Pacific League debut in 1992 for the Orix BlueWave at the age of 18, but he spent most of his first two seasons in the farm system (accumulating 156 minor league hits and a .368 batting average) because his then-manager, Shōzō Doi, refused to accept Ichiro's unorthodox swing. The swing was nicknamed  because of the pendulum-like motion of his leg, which shifts his weight forward as he swings the bat, and goes against conventional hitting theory.  In his second career game, he recorded his first ichi-gun (Japan's Nippon Professional Baseball League) hit in the Pacific League against Fukuoka Daiei Hawks pitcher Keiji Kimura. Even though he hit in 1993 a home run against Hideo Nomo, who later won an MLB National League Rookie of the Year Award while a Los Angeles Dodger, Ichiro was nevertheless sent back to the farm system on that very day. In 1994, he benefited from the arrival of a new manager, Akira Ōgi, who played him every day in the second spot of the lineup. He was eventually moved to the leadoff spot, where his immediate productivity dissolved any misgivings about his unconventional swing. He set a Japanese single-season record with 210 hits, the first player ever to top 200 hits in a single season. Five other players have since done so: Matt Murton, Norichika Aoki (twice), Alex Ramírez, Tsuyoshi Nishioka, and Shogo Akiyama's 216 hits in 2015, but those players benefited from 140+ game seasons while Ichiro's 210 hits had come in a 130-game season.

Ichiro's .385 batting average in 1994 was a Pacific League record and won the young outfielder the first of a record seven consecutive batting titles. Ichiro also hit 13 home runs and had 29 stolen bases, helping him to earn his first of three straight Pacific League MVP (Most Valuable Player) awards. It was during the 1994 season that he began to use his given name, "Ichiro," instead of his family name, "Suzuki," on the back of his uniform. Suzuki is the second-most-common family name in Japan, and his manager introduced the idea as a publicity move to help create a new image for what had been a relatively weak team, as well as a way to distinguish their rising star. Initially, Ichiro disliked the practice and was embarrassed by it; however, "Ichiro" was a household name by the end of the season, and he was flooded with endorsement offers.

In 1995, Ichiro led the Blue Wave to its first Pacific League pennant in 12 years. In addition to his second batting title, he led the league with 80 RBI and 49 stolen bases, while his career-high 25 home runs were third in the league. The following year, with Ichiro winning his third-straight MVP award, the team defeated the Central League champion, Yomiuri Giants, in the Japan Series. Following the 1996 season, playing in an exhibition series against a visiting team of Major League All-Stars kindled Ichiro's desire to travel to the United States to play in the Major Leagues.

In November 1998, Ichiro participated in a seven-game exhibition series between Japanese and American all-stars. Ichiro batted .380 and collected seven stolen bases in the series, winning praise from several of his MLB counterparts, including Sammy Sosa and Jamie Moyer (who would become his teammate with the Mariners).

In 2000, Ichiro was still a year away from being eligible for free agency, but the Blue Wave was no longer among Japan's best teams. Because the team would probably not be able to afford to keep him and would lose him without compensation in another year, Orix allowed him to negotiate with Major League clubs. Ichiro used the posting system, and the Seattle Mariners won the right to negotiate with him with a bid of approximately $13 million. In November, Ichiro signed a three-year, $14 million contract with the Seattle Mariners. In his nine NPB seasons in Japan, Ichiro had 1,278 hits, a .353 career batting average, and won seven Golden Glove Awards. Ichiro's time in the Japanese baseball leagues matured him as a player and a person, and he often credits it for his success.

Career in MLB

Seattle Mariners (2001–2012)

2001: first postseason appearance

Due to an agreement between Japanese baseball and the MLB, Ichiro was not allowed to play in the United States before 2001. His move to the United States was viewed with some interest because he was among the first Japanese position players to play for an MLB team. In the same way that many Japanese teams had considered the 18-year-old Ichiro too small to draft in 1992, many Americans believed he would prove too frail to succeed against Major League pitching or endure the longer 162-game season. Ichiro made an auspicious debut with Seattle, and in the Mariners' eighth game revealed his tremendous throwing arm by gunning down Oakland's Terrence Long, who had tried to advance from first to third on a teammate's single to right field. That play would be dubbed "The Throw" by Japanese media covering Ichiro's progress.

After expressing no preference as to a uniform number, Ichiro was issued #51 by the Mariners, which was his number when he played in Japan. He was initially hesitant because it had previously been worn by pitching star Randy Johnson. To avoid insulting Johnson, Ichiro sent a personal message to the pitcher promising not to "bring shame" to the uniform. His trepidation was unfounded, as he had a remarkable 2001 season, accumulating a rookie-record 242 hits, breaking Lloyd Waner’s rookie record of 223 hits dating back in 1927, and the most hits by any MLB player since 1930. His perennial Gold Glove fielding led Safeco's right field to be dubbed "Area 51". With a .350 batting average and 56 stolen bases, Ichiro was the first player to lead his league in both categories since Jackie Robinson in 1949. The season included hitting streaks of 25 and 23 games, an appearance on the cover of Sports Illustrated, and intense media attention on both sides of the Pacific. Fans from Japan were taking $2,000 baseball tours, sometimes flying in and out of the U.S. just to watch Ichiro's games. More than 150 Japanese reporters and photographers were given media access. Safeco Field's sushi stands began selling "Ichirolls", a spicy tuna roll served with wasabi and ginger.

Aided by Major League Baseball's decision to allow All-Star voting in Japan, Ichiro was the first rookie to lead all players in voting for the All-Star Game. That winter, he won the American League Most Valuable Player and the Rookie of the Year awards, becoming only the second player in MLB history (after Fred Lynn) to receive both honors in the same season. Ichiro is also the only player in major league history to have won an MVP, Rookie of the Year, Gold Glove Award, Silver Slugger Award, all while starting in the All-Star Game in the same season.

2001 had been an exceptionally successful regular season for the Seattle Mariners as a team, as they matched the 1906 Chicago Cubs' Major League record of 116 wins. In his only postseason appearance with the Mariners, Ichiro continued his hot hitting into the playoffs, batting .600 in the ALDS against the Cleveland Indians. However, on Ichiro's 28th birthday, Seattle's stellar season ended against the New York Yankees in the ALCS, as Ichiro was held to a .222 average during the series. Yankees manager Joe Torre had emphasized to his pitchers, "Do not let Ichiro beat you. He is the key to Seattle's offense." Informed of this assessment, Ichiro said, "If that is true, it would give me great joy. I don't believe he is right."

2002

Ichiro finished his second year in American baseball with 208 total hits, making him the first Mariners player ever with two consecutive seasons of 200+ hits. He got off to a hot start in 2002, but a late-season slump drove his batting average down to .321, 29 points below his batting average as a rookie. He was the fifth player in MLB history to start a career with two 200-hit seasons. Ichiro finished the season second in the AL in hits, fourth in batting average, and fourth in steals. Ichiro led the major league All-Star balloting for the second straight year. Although the Mariners had a 93–69 record, that was good for only a third-place finish in the competitive AL West.

2003
In 2003, Ichiro became just the third player in history to begin his career with three 200-hit seasons, by garnering 212. He again finished in the top ten for hits, batting average, steals, and runs, and, again, a late-season slump brought his average down almost 40 points (to .312). Ichiro was elected to his third All-Star game in the three years he had been in the league, and he was again the vote leader in both leagues. However, the second-place Mariners again fell short of the playoffs.

2004
 Ichiro had his best offensive season in 2004, highlighted by his breaking of George Sisler's 84-year-old record for most hits (257) in a season. An increase in games played benefited Ichiro, as he accumulated only 251 hits through the first 154 games of the season. Ichiro recorded 50 hits in four different months of the year (September and October are combined by MLB for this computational purpose), becoming the first player ever to have four in a season. With 51 hits in August 2001, Ichiro joined Pete Rose as the only players with five 50-hit months in a career.

On 21 May, Ichiro recorded his 2,000th professional hit. His 200th hit of 2004 came in just his 126th game. By the end of September, with one three-game series remaining, Ichiro's hit total stood at 256—one shy of Sisler. Ichiro singled off the Rangers' Ryan Drese on 1 October to tie Sisler's record. In the third inning, on a 3–2 count, Ichiro singled up the middle for his 258th hit of the year, which Ichiro later called "the greatest moment of my baseball career". He was greeted by a swarm of teammates, and a standing ovation from the fans. Sisler's daughter, Frances Sisler Drochelman attended the game and was greeted by Ichiro after his hit. Ichiro finished the 2004 season with a record of 262 hits, giving him the single-season records for both the United States and Japanese baseball.

In July 2009, while in St. Louis for his ninth All-Star appearance, Ichiro made a trip to Sisler's grave. He later told reporters, "There's not many chances to come to St. Louis. In 2004, it was the first time I crossed paths with him, and his family generously came all the way to Seattle. Above all, it was a chance. I wanted to do that for a grand upperclassman of the baseball world. I think it's only natural for someone to want to do that, to express my feelings in that way. I'm not sure if he's happy about it."

From 2001 to 2004, Ichiro had more hits (924) than anyone in history over any four-year period, breaking the record of 918 that Bill Terry accumulated from 1929 to 1932; Terry, however, played in 34 fewer games than Ichiro during their respective four-year spans. He would later surpass his own mark by recording 930 hits from 2004 to 2007. During one 56-game stretch in 2004, Ichiro batted over .450. By comparison, Joe DiMaggio batted .408 during his record-setting 56-game hitting streak. Ichiro batted over .400 against left-handed pitching in 2004.

2005
During the off-season, then-manager Bob Melvin's contract was not extended and the Mariners brought in Mike Hargrove as the new manager with a contract through 2007. It was Hargrove who had predicted that Ichiro would be no better than "a fourth outfielder on [an American] major league team" back when Ichiro was still in Japan. Speculation started that Hargrove and Ichiro did not get along very well in the season.

In 2005, Ichiro had his second worst year in his MLB career to date, collecting only 206 hits (the lowest total of his career to that point). However, he reached the plateau of a .300 batting average, 100+ runs, 30+ steals, and 200+ hits for the fifth straight season. That allowed Ichiro to become the first player to collect 200 hits per season in each of his first five years in the Major Leagues. Only Willie Keeler, Wade Boggs, Chuck Klein, Al Simmons, and Charlie Gehringer had had five consecutive 200-hit seasons at any point in their careers. During the season, he accumulated 1,000 career hits, reaching the career milestone faster than any other player in MLB history. Ichiro hit a career-high 15 home runs. In the off-season, Ichiro played himself in Furuhata Ninzaburō, a Japanese Columbo-like TV drama that he loves. In the drama, he kills a person and is arrested.

Inaugural World Baseball Classic

Ichiro played for the Japan national baseball team in the inaugural World Baseball Classic in March 2006. During the 15 March Japan-Korea game, Ichiro was booed by some spectators during every at-bat, reportedly in response to a previous statement that he wanted to "beat South Korea so badly that the South Koreans won't want to play Japan for another 30 years." That, however, was an incorrect translation mostly spread to the public through ESPN. Ichiro was variously quoted as saying "I want to win in a way that the opponent would think, 'we cannot catch up with Japan for the coming 30 years'. We should not merely win the games." Japan would later beat Korea in the playoffs and win the tournament after defeating Cuba 10–6 in the finals. For the tournament, Ichiro had twelve hits including a home run, seven runs, and four stolen bases.

2006

Ichiro's 2006 season got off to a disappointing start, with the outfielder hitting as low as .177 in the season's third week. He quickly rebounded, finishing the season with a .322 average (sixth in the AL and 11th in the majors). Ichiro's 224 hits led the majors, and he recorded 110 runs and 45 stolen bases. Ichiro was caught stealing only twice in 2006 for a 96% success rate. His 1,354 career U.S. hits topped Wade Boggs's record for the most hits in any six-year period. In his sixth year in the majors, Ichiro collected his sixth Gold Glove Award, and a sixth All-Star Game selection. He also won a Fielding Bible Award as the best fielding MLB right fielder.

Ichiro began wearing high stocking baseball pants in the 2006 World Baseball Classic.

2007

In May and June, Ichiro hit in 25 consecutive games, breaking the previous Seattle Mariners record set by Joey Cora in 1997. Ichiro broke Tim Raines' American League record by stealing 41 consecutive bases without being caught. Ichiro extended the record to 45; the major league record of 50 belongs to Vince Coleman.

On 10 July 2007, he became the first player to hit an inside-the-park home run in any MLB All-Star Game after an unpredictable hop off the right field wall of AT&T Park in San Francisco. It was the first inside-the-park home run of Ichiro's professional career. Ichiro was a perfect 3-for-3 in the game and was named the Most Valuable Player in the American League's 5–4 victory.

2007 marked the end of Ichiro's second contract with the Mariners, and he initially told MLB.com that he would likely enter the free agent market, citing the team's lack of success in recent years. However, Ichiro signed a five-year contract extension with Seattle in July. The deal was reported to be worth $90 million, consisting of a $17 million annual salary and $5 million signing bonus. The Associated Press reported that Ichiro's contract extension defers $25 million of the $90 million at 5.5% interest until after his retirement, with payments through 2032. Other provisions in Ichiro's contract included a yearly housing allowance of more than $30,000, and four first-class round-trip tickets to Japan each year for his family. He was provided with either a new Jeep or Mercedes SUV, as well as a personal trainer and interpreter.

On 29 July 2007, Ichiro collected his 1,500th U.S. hit, the third fastest to reach the MLB milestone behind Al Simmons and George Sisler. Ichiro had 213 hits in 2008, his eighth straight 200-hit season. This tied the 107-year-old record set by Wee Willie Keeler. Typically, Ichiro was among baseball's leaders in reaching base on an error (14 times in 2008, more than any other batter in the AL), and in infield hits (his 56 were the most in the majors). Ichiro has amassed more than 450 infield hits in his U.S. career. Detroit third baseman Brandon Inge told The New York Times, "I wish you could put a camera at third base to see how he hits the ball and see the way it deceives you. You can call some guys' infield hits cheap, but not his. He has amazing technique." In May 2008, Ichiro stole two bases, giving him a career total of 292, surpassing the previous Seattle Mariners team record of 290 set by second baseman Julio Cruz. Cruz, who now does Spanish-language broadcasts of Mariners games, was watching from the broadcast booth as Ichiro broke his record.

2008
On 29 July 2008, Ichiro became the second-youngest player to amass 3,000 top-level professional hits (1,278 in Japan + 1,722 in the U.S.) after Ty Cobb. He also became just the second Japanese professional to get 3,000 hits. (Nippon Professional Baseball's record holder is Isao Harimoto, with 3,085 hits).

By 2008, it had emerged in the media that Ichiro was known within baseball for his tradition of exhorting the American League team with a profanity-laced pregame speech in the clubhouse prior to the MLB All-Star Game. Asked if the speech had had any effect on the AL's decade-long winning streak, Ichiro deadpanned, "I've got to say over 90 percent." Minnesota first baseman Justin Morneau describes the effect: "If you've never seen it, it's definitely something pretty funny. It's hard to explain, the effect it has on everyone. It's such a tense environment. Everyone's a little nervous for the game, and then he comes out. He doesn't say a whole lot the whole time he's in there, and all of a sudden, the manager gets done with his speech, and he pops off." Boston's slugger David Ortiz says simply, "It's why we win."

2009 World Baseball Classic
Despite struggling uncharacteristically during most of the tournament, Ichiro provided the game-winning hit in the Championship game against South Korea. With two outs in the top of the tenth inning, he broke a 3–3 tie with a two-run single off a ball in the dirt. This would prove to be the margin of victory in Japan's 5–3 defeat of South Korea. Ichiro ended the night 4-for-6, bringing his total to 6-for-10 in WBC championship games.

2009

Ichiro began his 2009 season by going on the disabled list for the first time in his career. He had a bleeding ulcer, which team doctor Mitch Storey said may have been caused in part by the stress of playing in the World Baseball Classic. After missing 8 games, Ichiro debuted on 15 April and went 2-for-5 against the Angels, including a grand slam for his 3,085th overall professional career hit. The home run matched Isao Harimoto's Japanese record for career hits, and Harimoto had been flown out to Seattle to witness the event. Ichiro surpassed the record the following night.

Ichiro was named #30 on the Sporting News''' 2009 list of the 50 greatest current players in baseball, voted upon by a 100-person panel of experts and former stars. In May and June, Ichiro surpassed his own franchise record with a 27-game hitting streak. Ichiro went on to record 44 hits in June 2009, his 20th career month with 40 or more hits. The previous players to have accomplished this were Stan Musial in the NL and Lou Gehrig in the AL.

On 6 September against the Oakland A's, Ichiro collected his 2,000th MLB hit on the second pitch of the game, a double along the first base foul line. He is the second-fastest player to reach the milestone, behind Al Simmons. On 13 September against the Texas Rangers, Ichiro collected his 200th hit of the season for the ninth consecutive year, setting an all-time major league record. Ichiro recorded 210 hits with Orix in 1994, thereby giving him a total of ten 200 hit seasons in his professional career.

With two outs in the bottom of the 9th inning, 18 September, Ichiro hit a walk-off, two-run home run against Yankees closer Mariano Rivera, scoring Michael Saunders in one of the more memorable victories of the season. His homer made a winner out of Félix Hernández, who was in line for the loss despite having allowed only one run in 9 innings pitched.

On 26 September 2009, Ichiro was ejected from a game for the first time in his professional career. Arguing that a strikeout pitch from Toronto's David Purcey had been outside, Ichiro used his bat to draw a line on the outer edge of the plate, and was immediately tossed by umpire Brian Runge. He was the only Mariner to be ejected from a game all season. The ejection may have hurt Ichiro's chances regarding an esoteric record: the longest playing streak without going hitless in consecutive games. Ichiro's stretch was at 180 games, the longest in the majors since Doc Cramer went 191 consecutive games without back-to-back 0-fers in 1934–35. Ichiro went hitless in the following afternoon's game.

Ichiro again led the majors in hits in 2009, with 225. In spite of hitting ground balls at a rate of 55 percent, he grounded into only one double play all season, in 15 April game, his first game played in 2009. He won his second Fielding Bible Award as the best fielding right fielder in MLB.

2010

Ichiro's 32 career leadoff home runs rank ninth all time. Nevertheless, in 2009, Ichiro told The New York Times:

Chicks who dig home runs aren't the ones who appeal to me. I think there's sexiness in infield hits because they require technique. I'd rather impress the chicks with my technique than with my brute strength. Then, every now and then, just to show I can do that, too, I might flirt a little by hitting one out.

After playing in the season opener against the Oakland Athletics, Ichiro became eligible for Hall of Fame consideration, by playing in his tenth MLB season. On 5 June 2010, Ichiro scored his 1,000th career MLB run against the Angels on Franklin Gutierrez's RBI groundout. On 1 September 2010, Ichiro also collected his 2,200th hit, a leadoff infield single against Cleveland Indians pitcher Josh Tomlin.

During the August 2010 series against the New York Yankees, Ichiro traveled to the Calvary Cemetery in Queens, New York, to pay his respects at the grave of Hall-of-Famer "Wee Willie" Keeler, whose record for single-season hits he had broken in 2004.

On 23 September, Ichiro hit a single to center field against Toronto Blue Jays pitcher Shawn Hill to become the first MLB player in history to reach the 200 hit mark for 10 consecutive seasons. This feat also tied him with Pete Rose for the most career seasons of 200+ hits, and he surpassed Ty Cobb for most career seasons of 200+ hits in the AL. He finished the season with 214 hits, topping the MLB in that category. Ichiro also finished the season "ironman" style, playing in all 162 games. Only Ichiro and Matt Kemp did so for the 2010 season. This was Ichiro's 3rd season playing in all 162 games. Also, Ichiro was nominated for the This Year in Baseball Award. Ichiro finished first or second in hits in all of his first 10 MLB seasons.

Ichiro won his tenth consecutive Rawlings Gold Glove Award in 2010, tying Ken Griffey Jr., Andruw Jones, and Al Kaline, and trailing only Roberto Clemente and Willie Mays (twelve each) for major league outfielders. Ichiro also won his second consecutive and third overall Fielding Bible Award for his statistically based defensive excellence in right field, as the only right fielder to have so far received multiple Bible awards. Jason Heyward subsequently equaled Ichiro with his third Bible in 2015; thereafter Mookie Betts promptly became the third right fielder to achieve this distinction in 2018, on three consecutive awards.

2011
On 2 April 2011, Ichiro broke the Seattle Mariners' all-time career hits record with his 2,248th hit in the 9th inning versus the Oakland Athletics, overtaking the team's previous leader Edgar Martínez. 2011 marked the first time in Ichiro's 11 seasons that he failed to make the all star team. He batted under .300 (.277) before the all star break for the first time in his career. On 10 July, manager Eric Wedge did not start Ichiro, ending his then-major league-best active streak of 255 consecutive starts. Ichiro followed with an 11-game hitting streak, but Wedge noted "it's not that easy to give that guy a day off" due to Ichiro's iconic stature. On 22 August, Ichiro hit his 35th career leadoff homer, tying him for 6th place with Bobby Bonds. Ichiro finished the season batting a career-low .272 with 184 hits, the first time in his 11-year MLB career he did not record 200 hits. It was also his first season not playing in the All-Star game, as well as his first season not winning a Gold Glove.

2012

On 19 June 2012, Ichiro led off a game against the Arizona Diamondbacks with a single to center field, the 2,500th hit of his MLB career. Ichiro reached the milestone in the fourth-fewest games in major league history, after Al Simmons, Ty Cobb, and George Sisler. In a 13-inning road loss to the Oakland A's on 8 July, Ichiro was placed second in the batting order and responded by going 2 for 6 to bring his season batting average to .261 heading into the All-Star break. In the previous night's game, Ichiro recorded two hits to break a career-worst 0-for-23 hitless streak. Ichiro had also been tried at the three-spot in the batting order during a season for which he earned $18 million. Former teammate Jay Buhner stated he felt Ichiro was the recipient of too much blame for the Mariners' difficulties but "at the same time, they need help desperately." Buhner stated that if Ichiro were awarded a three-year contract extension for somewhere between $35 million and $40 million, "I'd vomit. I mean, really, no offense. No offense, we've got to get this organization turned around. You can't be spending all the money on one guy."

With a contract extension with the Mariners unknown, Ichiro stated, "It's going to go both ways. It can't just come from the player. It's got to come from the team, too. If the team is saying they need you, you're necessary, then it becomes a piece. But if it's just coming from the player, it's not going to happen." Ichiro's agent, Tony Attanasio, said, "He knows that the club has to grow. He knows they have to play the younger guys and get them more playing time. The only way he knows to do that is to move on. He doesn't want to stop playing. He wants to continue."

New York Yankees (2012–2014)
Rest of 2012: second postseason appearance
Ichiro approached the Mariners to ask for a trade at midseason in 2012. His first choice was to play for the New York Yankees. The Mariners traded him to the Yankees for minor league pitchers D. J. Mitchell and Danny Farquhar on 23 July. Seattle also received cash in the trade. Ichiro left Seattle hitting .261 with a .288 on-base percentage (OBP), four home runs, 28 RBIs and 15 stolen bases in 95 games. His first game as a Yankee was played the night of the trade, at Safeco Field against the Mariners. Before the trade was consummated, Ichiro agreed to the Yankees' conditions, which stated that they would play Ichiro primarily in left field, bat him at the bottom of the lineup, and occasionally sit him against left-handed pitching. Ichiro would go on to hit safely in his first 12 games as a Yankee, tying a record set by Don Slaught. He wore number 31 during his tenure with the Yankees, as his traditional 51 had not been used since the 2006 retirement of Bernie Williams, who wore it while playing for the Yankees; the Yankees retired the number in 2015.

Ichiro hit his first home run as a Yankee, and the 100th of his career, on 30 July against the Baltimore Orioles. For the week ending 23 September, Ichiro was named AL Player of the Week after hitting .600 (15-for-25) with three doubles, two home runs, five RBI, seven runs scored, and six stolen bases in six games. He led all MLB players in batting average, hits, steals and OBP (.630). In 67 games with New York, Ichiro batted .322 with a .340 OBP, 28 runs, five home runs and 27 RBIs. With his improved performance, the Yankees at times batted him second and also started him against left-handers.

Against the Baltimore Orioles in the 2012 ALDS, Ichiro ran home on a ball hit by Robinson Canó. Despite the ball beating him to the plate, Orioles catcher Matt Wieters had difficulty tagging Ichiro, who evaded multiple tag attempts by jumping over and around Wieters. In Game 1 of the 2012 ALCS, Ichiro hit his first career postseason home run; however, the Yankees lost the series to the Detroit Tigers in 4 games.

On 19 December 2012, Ichiro finalized a $13 million deal for two years with the Yankees.

2013
On 25 June 2013, Ichiro hit a walk-off home run against Rangers pitcher Tanner Scheppers with two outs in the bottom of the ninth inning. Earlier in the game, three of his teammates had led off the fourth, fifth, and sixth innings with home runs, so all of the Yankees' runs in the game were provided by solo home runs.

On 21 August 2013, Ichiro collected his 4,000th professional career hit with a single off Toronto Blue Jays pitcher R. A. Dickey, becoming the seventh player in professional baseball history known to have reached the mark after Pete Rose, Ty Cobb, Julio Franco, Hank Aaron, Jigger Statz, and Stan Musial.

2014
On 10 July 2014, Ichiro collected his 2,800th MLB hit off of Cleveland Indians pitcher Scott Atchison in the top of the eighth inning at Progressive Field. On 9 August 2014, Ichiro hit a single in a game against the Astros to pass George Sisler on the all-time hit list with his 2,811th hit. Ichiro had previously broken Sisler's single season hit record in the 2004 season.

Miami Marlins (2015–2017)
2015
On 23 January 2015, Ichiro agreed to a one-year, $2 million contract with the Miami Marlins. The Marlins originally planned for him to be their fourth outfielder, but he finished the season with 439 plate appearances due to team injuries—primarily Giancarlo Stanton, who suffered a season-ending injury on 26 June. On 25 April, Ichiro scored his 1,310th major league run, which, combined with the 658 runs he scored in Japan, surpassed the record for runs scored by a Japanese player set by Sadaharu Oh. On 18 June, he was batting .294 after playing in 64 of the Marlins' 68 games, but his average fell to .229 by season's end. On 14 August at Busch Stadium, Ichiro singled off St. Louis Cardinals starter John Lackey to earn his 4,192nd top-level hit, passing Ty Cobb. On 29 July, Ichiro recorded his 2,900th major league hit, against Washington Nationals pitcher Doug Fister. On 18 August, Ichiro had his first four-hit game since 2013. On 31 August, against the Atlanta Braves, Ichiro scored his 2,000th professional run when combining his runs scored in MLB (1,342) and in Japan's NPB (658). On 5 September, Ichiro recorded his 100th right field assist in the major leagues. In the season finale against the Philadelphia Phillies on 4 October, he made his major league pitching debut, completing the final inning and allowing one run and two hits in a 7–2 loss. For the 2015 season, he batted .229/.282/.279 with 11 stolen bases.

2016
On 6 October 2015, Ichiro and the Marlins agreed on a one-year, $2 million contract for the 2016 season. The deal also came with a $2 million club option for 2017. He stole his 500th career MLB base on 29 April 2016, against the Milwaukee Brewers, and led off the game with a single against Zach Davies to move ahead of Frank Robinson into 33rd place on the all-time MLB hit list with the 2,944th hit of his career.

On 15 June, Ichiro recorded his 4,257 career hit, breaking Pete Rose's all-time record for hits in top tier professional baseball. Rose commented that "I'm not trying to take anything away from Ichiro, he's had a Hall of Fame career, but the next thing you know you'll be counting his high school hits". This was in response to the Japanese media labeling Ichiro as the "Hit King", claiming that Ichiro should be considered to be the all-time hits leader when his hits in Japan are included.

On 7 August, Ichiro collected the 3,000th hit of his MLB career when he hit a triple off the right field wall at Coors Field playing against the Colorado Rockies. He is just the second player to reach that milestone by way of a triple, joining Hall of Famer Paul Molitor. He also became one of only seven players to have collected 3,000 hits and 500 stolen bases. At the end of his 16th season, Ichiro had played in exactly 2,500 major league games. Ichiro and Pete Rose are the only two players in MLB history to have accomplished playing in 2,500 games in their first 16 seasons.

After the 2016 season, the Marlins exercised their option on Ichiro's contract for the 2017 season, and added an option for the 2018 season.

2017
On 19 April, Ichiro hit his first home run against his former team the Seattle Mariners, a 9th-inning drive off Evan Marshall. Ichiro scored his 1400th run in a 23 May game against the Oakland A's.

On 14 June, Ichiro singled for his 365th interleague hit, passing Derek Jeter (364) to become the all-time leader in interleague hits. Ichiro finished 2017 with 368 interleague hits. This total would be surpassed by Miguel Cabrera on September 7, 2021.

On 25 June, Ichiro (age 43 and 246 days) became the oldest player to start a game in center field since at least 1900, breaking the record previously held by Rickey Henderson. On 29 June, Ichiro became the oldest active MLB player when Bartolo Colón was designated for assignment by the Atlanta Braves, although Colon latched on with the Minnesota Twins a few weeks later. On 6 July, Ichiro hit two singles against the St. Louis Cardinals, bringing his hits total to 3,054 and surpassing Panamanian-born Rod Carew as the all-time leader in MLB hits among foreign-born players. Dominican born Adrian Beltre surpassed Ichiro as the foreign hits leader on 13 June 2018.

On 26 August, Ichiro set the Marlins' single-season franchise record for pinch-hits with his 22nd pinch hit. On 3 September, he set a major league record for most pinch-hit at-bats in a season, with 84, and four days later he set a major league record for most pinch-hit plate appearances in a season, with 95. On 8 September, Ichiro became the sixth player all-time to hit 2,500 career singles, as well as the 8th right fielder of all-time to record over 4,000 putouts at the position. On 1 October, Ichiro flied out in his last chance to tie John Vander Wal's MLB record of 28 pinch hits in a season, finishing with 27.

For the season, he batted .255/.318/.332 with one stolen base (the first season in which he did not steal at least 10 bases). After the season, the Marlins declined a $2 million club option for the 2018 season, instead paying Ichiro a $500,000 buyout.

Second stint with the Mariners
2018

On 7 March 2018, Ichiro signed a one-year contract to return to the Mariners after several team outfielders were injured during spring training. On Opening Day, 29 March, against the Cleveland Indians, Ichiro became the 20th outfielder all-time to record 5,000 career putouts at the position. At 44 years old, he entered the 2018 season as the second-oldest active player in baseball, behind only Bartolo Colón.

On 3 May, the Mariners announced that Ichiro would move to the front office as a special assistant to the chairman for the remainder of the season, but Ichiro did not rule out a possible return as a player for the 2019 season. In his final game for the year on the previous day, he went 0-for-3 with a walk, a strikeout, and a run in a 3–2 loss to the Oakland Athletics. This would end up being his last game played at Safeco Field. In 15 games played with the 2018 Mariners, Ichiro batted 9-for-44 (.205/.255/.205) without an extra base hit, stolen base, or RBI.

At the time of his sabbatical as an active player, Ichiro held the record for most hits in Major League Baseball history by a foreign-born player (3,089). He was surpassed six weeks later by Adrián Beltré.

On 11 May, he became the interim bench coach for two games as manager Scott Servais was gone to attend his daughter's college graduation and regular bench coach Manny Acta was filling in as manager.

2019
On 2 October 2018, it was announced that Ichiro would be on the Mariners' active roster when they opened the 2019 season against the Oakland Athletics in Japan. Ichiro was re-signed to a minor league deal on 23 January 2019.

On 20 March 2019, the Mariners opened the MLB season against the Athletics at the Tokyo Dome and Ichiro started the game in right field, becoming at 45 years old the second oldest position player (behind Julio Franco) to start for a team on its opening day. The next night, the Mariners again played the Athletics at the Tokyo Dome and Ichiro played in his final professional game. He went 0–4 at the plate and in the bottom of the eighth inning walked off the field to applause. Later in the day, Ichiro officially announced his retirement. He was the oldest active MLB player at the time.

2019 was Ichiro's 19th season in the MLB, and including the nine years he played in Japan's NPB, Ichiro's 28 seasons of playing in baseball's top-tiered leagues eclipsed the record of most seasons played by a position player held previously by 19th century MLB player Cap Anson.  (MLB pitcher Nolan Ryan, like Anson, also played 27 seasons, while NPB pitcher Kimiyasu Kudo played 29 seasons).

On 30 April, Ichiro renewed his role with the Mariners from the previous year as special assistant to the chairman.

On 27 August 2022, Ichiro was inducted into the Seattle Mariners Hall of Fame.

Playing style

Sportswriter Bruce Jenkins, writing in the San Francisco Chronicle, described Ichiro's distinctive style of play:

There's nobody like Ichiro in either league—now or ever. He exists strictly within his own world, playing a game 100 percent unfamiliar to everyone else. The game has known plenty of 'slap' hitters, but none who sacrifice so much natural ability for the sake of the art. And he'll go deep occasionally in games, looking very much like someone who could do it again, often ... [but] the man lives for hits, little tiny ones, and the glory of standing atop the world in that category. Every spring, scouts or media types write him off, swearing that opposing pitchers have found the key, and they are embarrassingly wrong.

While he is known for his hitting ability, he did not draw many walks. In 2004, when he set the single-season record for hits, his low walk total (49) led to him being on base a total of 315 times. It was the 58th-most times a player has reached base in a season and short of the major league record of 379 set by Babe Ruth in 1923.The New York Times criticized his inability to improve his power when his Mariner teams were often low-scoring while noting that he also did not steal bases as frequently as Rickey Henderson or Tim Raines. Ichiro, however, once commented, "If I'm allowed to hit .220, I could probably hit 40 [home runs], but nobody wants that."

Ichiro has long been interested in pitching professionally, and he actually took the mound to pitch to one batter in the 1996 NPB All Star game, reaching close to 91 MPH (145 km) in warm up pitches. In 2009, it was reported that during an early February workout at the World Baseball Classic his fastball was clocked at 92 mph. On the final day of the 2015 season on 4 October, Ichiro pitched in his first MLB game, throwing one complete inning at the end of a 7–2 Marlins loss against the Philadelphia Phillies, allowing one run on two hits. Less than three weeks before turning 42, he was still able to touch 88 mph with his fastball to go along with a mid 80s slider.

Ichiro is the only left-handed hitter in Major League history with at least 2,000 plate appearances against left-handed pitching to display a reverse platoon split—that is, he had better results hitting off left-handed pitchers than right-handed pitchers.

Ichiro received recognition for playing superior defense in right field, with above-average range and a strong and accurate throwing arm. During his career, he won 10 Gold Glove Awards.

Personality and influence

Ichiro is noted for his work ethic in arriving early for his team's games, and for his calisthenic stretching exercises to stay limber even during the middle of the game. Continuing in Seattle the custom he began in Japan, he used his given name (written in rōmaji) on the back of his uniform instead of his family name, becoming the first player in Major League Baseball to do so since Vida Blue.

In addition to being a ten-time Gold Glove winner, Ichiro was a ten-time All-Star selection from 2001 to 2010. His success has been credited with opening the door for other Japanese players like former Yomiuri Giants slugger Hideki Matsui, former Fukuoka SoftBank Hawks catcher Kenji Johjima, former teammate So Taguchi, and former Seibu Lions infielder Kazuo Matsui and active players Shohei Ohtani and Seiya Suzuki to enter the Major Leagues. Ichiro's career is followed closely in Japan, with national television news programs covering each of his at-bats, and with special tour packages arranged for Japanese fans to visit the United States to attend his games.

Ichiro's agent, Tony Attanasio, described his client's status: "When you mail Ichiro something from the States, you only have to use that name on the address and he gets it [in Japan]. He's that big." Ichiro's status in Japan fueled interest in Major League Baseball in Japan, including the $275 million broadcasting rights deal between MLB and Dentsu Inc. in 2003.

Ichiro performs in TV commercials in Japan for ENEOS. His likeness is used as the basis of the character "Kyoshiro" in the anime and manga Major.

When he first came to the United States, he especially enjoyed trips to Kansas City to talk with former Negro leagues star Buck O'Neil. When O'Neil died in 2006, Ichiro sent a very large memorial wreath to the funeral service. The following year, he visited the Negro Leagues Baseball Museum while on a road trip to Kansas City and made what, as of 2016, remains the largest contribution ever made to the museum by an active MLB player.

When Ichiro was traded to the Yankees in July 2012, longtime Mariners fan Ben Gibbard (of Death Cab for Cutie) posted his tribute song, "Ichiro's Theme", on his SoundCloud page. The previous year, The Baseball Project had released the tribute song "Ichiro Goes To The Moon" on their album Volume 2: High and Inside.

 Endorsements 
Over the course of his career, Ichiro has endorsed numerous Japanese brands, although he was more reluctant to enter endorsement deals with American companies. According to Forbes, at one point in his career, Ichiro earned roughly $7 million annually from endorsements, most of which came from Japanese companies.

He was the face of Kirin Brewery, a Japanese beer brand. He has endorsed Japanese brands such as sporting goods company Mizuno Corporation, Nikko Cordial, NTT Communications, Asics, JXTG Nippon Oil & Energy. Ichiro also endorsed and Yunker energy drink on behalf of Sato Pharmaceutical and Oakley sunglasses.

As of 2001, Ichiro had deals with the US golfwear company Cutter & Buck, Upper Deck trading card company, and sporting goods company Majestic Athletic.

Ichiro's agent Tony Attanasio stated that Ichiro had rejected around $40 million in endorsements due to him being "very selective when it comes to putting his name out in the public"

Personal life

He has an elder brother, Kazuyasu Suzuki.

Ichiro married , a former TBS TV announcer, on 3 December 1999, at a small church in Santa Monica, California. , they have a pet dog (Shiba Inu) named Ikkyu, a combination of the first character in each of his and his wife's first names. The couple resided in Issaquah, Washington, during the season while he played in Seattle and in Greenwich, Connecticut, while he played for the Yankees. They resided in Miami Beach during seasons with the Marlins.

On 18 March 2011, Ichiro donated ¥100 million ($1.25 million) to the Japanese Red Cross for earthquake and tsunami relief efforts.

Ichiro's father, Nobuyuki, handled Ichiro's finances early in his career until, in 2002, due to Nobuyuki underreporting Ichiro's income, Ichiro was saddled with a significant bill for unpaid taxes. The scandal cost Ichiro an undisclosed amount of money and caused him embarrassment. This incident, along with Nobuyuki's relentless training and unforgiving attitude toward his son, caused their relationship to collapse. Subsequently, Ichiro's finances have been looked after by his wife Yumiko.

Since November 2000, Nobuyuki has run the Ichiro exhibition room named "I-fain" in Toyoyama, Ichiro's hometown. It exhibits a wide variety of Ichiro memorabilia, including personal items from his childhood and up-to-date baseball gear.

Ichiro is the honored chairman of the Ichiro Cup, a six-month-long boys' league tournament with more than 200 teams, held in Toyoyama and surrounding cities and towns since 1996. Ichiro watches the final game and attends its awards ceremony every year.

Ichiro speaks English well and often spoke it with his teammates in his playing days, but he uses an interpreter during interviews so that he is not misunderstood. He also learned Spanish early in his MLB career, using it to banter with other players. Ichiro further explains he did it because he felt a kinship to the Latin American players who, like him, were foreigners trying to succeed in the U.S.

See also

 Best Nine Award
 Commissioner's Historic Achievement Award
 3,000 hit club
 Fielding Bible Award
 History of the Japanese in Seattle
 Japan Professional Sports Grand Prize
 List of Major League Baseball annual stolen base leaders
 List of Major League Baseball batting champions
 List of Major League Baseball career at-bat leaders
 List of Major League Baseball career games played leaders
 List of Major League Baseball career hits leaders
 List of Major League Baseball career plate appearance leaders
 List of Major League Baseball career putouts as a right fielder leaders
 List of Major League Baseball career runs scored leaders
 List of Major League Baseball career singles leaders
 List of Major League Baseball career stolen bases leaders
 List of Major League Baseball career total bases leaders
 List of Major League Baseball hit records
 List of Major League Baseball players from Japan
 Major League Baseball titles leaders
 Matsutaro Shoriki Award
 Mitsui Golden Glove Award
 Meikyukai
 Nippon Professional Baseball All-Star Series
 Players Choice Awards
 Seattle Mariners award winners and league leaders
 This Year in Baseball Awards

References

Sources

Further reading
 Allen, Jim. Ichiro Magic. New York: Kodansha America, 2001. 
 Christopher, Matt, and Glenn Stout. At the Plate With... Ichiro. New York: Little, Brown, 2003. .
 Dougherty, Terri. Ichiro Suzuki. ?: Checkerboard Books, 2003. .
 
 Komatsu, Narumi, and Philip Gabriel. Ichiro on Ichiro: Conversations with Narumi Komatsu. Seattle: Sasquatch Books, 2004. .
 Leigh, David S. Ichiro Suzuki. Minneapolis: Twenty-First Century Books, 2004. .
 Levin, Judith. Ichiro Suzuki. New York: Chelsea House Publications, 2007. .
 Rappoport, Ken. Super Sports Star Ichiro Suzuki. Berkeley Heights, N.J.: Enslow Elementary, 2004. .
 Rosenthal, Jim. Ichiro's Art of Playing Baseball: Learn How to Hit, Steal, and Field Like an All-Star. New York: St. Martin's Griffin, 2006. .
 Savage, Jeff. Ichiro Suzuki. Minneapolis: Lerner Publications, 2003. .
 Shields, David. "Baseball Is Just Baseball": The Understated Ichiro: An Unauthorized Collection Compiled by David Shields. Seattle: TNI Books, 2001. .
 Stewart, Mark. Ichiro Suzuki: Best in the West. Minneapolis: Millbrook Press, 2002. .
 Whiting, Robert. The Meaning of Ichiro: The New Wave from Japan and the Transformation of Our National Pastime. Warner Books, 2004; retitled for the 2005 paperback to The Samurai Way of Baseball: The New Wave from Japan and the Transformation of Our National Pastime''. , .

External links

1973 births
2006 World Baseball Classic players
2009 World Baseball Classic players
American League All-Stars
American League batting champions
American League Most Valuable Player Award winners
American League stolen base champions
Gold Glove Award winners
Japanese expatriate baseball players in the United States
Living people
Major League Baseball All-Star Game MVPs
Major League Baseball outfielders
Major League Baseball players from Japan
Major League Baseball Rookie of the Year Award winners
Miami Marlins players
New York Yankees players
Nippon Professional Baseball MVP Award winners
Nippon Professional Baseball outfielders
Orix BlueWave players
Seattle Mariners players
Silver Slugger Award winners
Baseball people from Aichi Prefecture